On Wednesday, August 15, 2012, Seattle Mariners pitcher Félix Hernández pitched the 23rd and most recent perfect game in Major League Baseball (MLB) history and the first in Mariners' franchise history. Pitching to catcher John Jaso against the Tampa Bay Rays at Safeco Field in Seattle, Washington, Hernández retired all 27 batters that he faced and tallied 12 strikeouts in a 1–0 victory.

This was the third perfect game of the 2012 Major League Baseball season, following perfect games thrown by Philip Humber and Matt Cain, marking the first time that three perfect games were thrown in one MLB season. Also, as the Mariners were the losing team in Humber's perfect game, this was the first time that a team was on the losing and winning end of a perfect game in the same season. As Philip Humber's perfect game took place when the White Sox were visiting Safeco Field, this marked the first time two perfect games were thrown in the same park in the same season. It was also the second time in 2012 that the Mariners had pitched a no-hitter at Safeco Field; they pitched a combined no-hitter on June 8, beating the Los Angeles Dodgers, also 1–0, making it the first time that a team pitched a combined no-hitter and complete game no-hitter in the same season. It also marked the third time the Tampa Bay Rays had been on the receiving end of a perfect game in four seasons, having previously failed to reach first base against Dallas Braden in 2010 and Mark Buehrle in 2009. Evan Longoria, Carlos Peña, Melvin Upton, Jr., and Ben Zobrist all played for the Rays in all three games, tying Alfredo Griffin's dubious mark for most losing perfect games played in.

The game
Hernández threw 113 pitches, 77 of them strikes, striking out the side in the sixth and the eighth innings. Jeremy Hellickson, the starting pitcher for Tampa Bay, allowed one run in seven innings on a run batted in single by Jesús Montero in the third inning. Rays manager Joe Maddon was ejected from the game in the seventh inning for arguing a called strike with the home plate umpire Rob Drake.

Statistics

Linescore

Box score

FIELDING
E: Johnson, E (10, fielding).
DP: Zobrist-Pena, C.

BATTING
2B: Jaso (14, Hellickson).
TB: Ryan, B; Montero, J; Jaso 2; Ackley; Robinson, T.
RBI: Montero, J (46).
2-out RBI: Montero, J.
Runners left in scoring position, 2 out: Thames; Seager, K.
Team RISP: 1-for-3.
Team LOB: 5.

BASERUNNING
SB: Ryan, B (9, 2nd base off Hellickson/Lobaton).

Other info
LP: Hellickson.
Pitches-strikes: Hellickson 115-73; Farnsworth 15-9; Hernández, F 113-77.
Groundouts-flyouts: Hellickson 10-5; Farnsworth 0-1; Hernández, F 8-5.
Batters faced: Hellickson 27; Farnsworth 3; Hernández, F 27.
Ejections: Rays manager Joe Maddon (by HP umpire Rob Drake, 7th inning).
Umpires: HP: Rob Drake; 1B: Joe West; 2B: Sam Holbrook; 3B: Andy Fletcher.
Weather: , sunny.
Wind: 4 mph, in from CF.
Time: 2:22.
Attendance: 21,889.
Venue: Safeco Field.

See also

List of Major League Baseball perfect games
List of Major League Baseball no-hitters

References

2012 Major League Baseball season
Major League Baseball perfect games
Seattle Mariners
Tampa Bay Rays
August 2012 sports events in the United States
2012 in sports in Washington (state)
2012 in Seattle
Baseball competitions in Seattle